Islington East was a constituency which returned one Member of Parliament (MP) to the House of Commons of the Parliament of the United Kingdom from 1885, until it was abolished for the February 1974 general election.

Boundaries

1885–1918
The seat was created by the Redistribution of Seats Act 1885 as one of four divisions of the new parliamentary borough of Islington. The parliamentary borough was coterminous with the civil parish of Islington and each of the four divisions consisted of a number of parish wards used for the election of vestrymen to the incorporated vestry, the local authority for the area.

The East Division consisted of two wards: Canonbury and Highbury.

1918–1974
Constituencies throughout Great Britain and Ireland were reorganised by the Representation of the People Act 1918. In London, seats were realigned to the boundaries of the metropolitan boroughs that had been created in 1900. The Metropolitan Borough of Islington was divided into four constituencies with the Islington, East seat consisting of three wards as they existed in 1918: Canonbury, Highbury and Mildmay. At the next parliamentary redistribution, prior to the 1950 general election, the seat was unchanged.

The seat was last contested at the 1970 general election. By the time of the next election in 1974, new constituencies had been drawn based on the London boroughs created in 1965. The London Borough of Islington was divided between three constituencies, with the area of the abolished East seat mostly falling in the new Islington Central constituency.

Members of Parliament

Election results

Elections in the 1880s

Elections in the 1890s

Elections in the 1900s

Elections in the 1910s 

General election 1914–15:

Another general election was required to take place before the end of 1915. The political parties had been making preparations for an election to take place and by the July 1914, the following candidates had been selected; 
Liberal: Edward Smallwood
Unionist: Philip Pilditch

Elections in the 1920s

Elections in the 1930s 

General election 1939–40

Another general election was required to take place before the end of 1940. The political parties had been making preparations for an election to take place, and the following candidates had been selected by the Autumn of 1939: 
Conservative: Thelma Cazalet
Labour: H C Boyde 
Liberal: Cyril Blackburn

Elections in the 1940s

Elections in the 1950s

Elections in the 1960s

Elections in the 1970s

See also 
 1931 Islington East by-election
 List of parliamentary constituencies in Islington

References

 British Parliamentary Election Results 1885-1918, compiled and edited by F.W.S. Craig (Macmillan Press 1974)
 Debrett’s Illustrated Heraldic and Biographical House of Commons and the Judicial Bench 1886
 Debrett’s House of Commons and the Judicial Bench 1901
 Debrett’s House of Commons and the Judicial Bench 1918
 

Parliamentary constituencies in London (historic)
Constituencies of the Parliament of the United Kingdom established in 1885
Constituencies of the Parliament of the United Kingdom disestablished in 1974
Politics of the London Borough of Islington